Eupithecia rufivenata is a moth in the family Geometridae. It is found in Peru.

The wingspan is about 20 mm. The forewings are pale olive from the base to the central fascia, with a dark curved line close to the base. The hindwings are luteous grey, with traces of straight dark grey lines, plain only on the inner margin.

References

Moths described in 1907
rufivenata
Moths of South America